This list of recipients of the Democracy Service Medal covers recipients of the National Endowment for Democracy's Democracy Service Medal. The Medal was established in 1999 and awarded annually, sometimes to more than one person.

Recipients

 2016: Tenzin Delek Rinpoche (Tibet) (Posthumous)
 2013: Vytautas Landsbergis (Lithuania)
 2012: Madeleine K. Albright (USA), George P. Shultz (USA)
 2011: Laura Pollán, Cuba; Jean Bethke Elshtain, USA; Floribert Chebeya, Democratic Republic of the Congo
 2010: Vin Weber, USA; the Dalai Lama, Tibet; Francis Fukuyama, USA
 2009: Leszek Kołakowski, Poland
 2008: Max Kampelman, USA; Tom Lantos, USA 
 2007: Morton I. Abramowitz, USA; Emmanuel Kampouris, USA; Václav Havel, Czech Republic
 2006: Thomas R. Donahue, USA
 2005: John C. Whitehead, USA; John Richardson, Jr., USA
 2004: Bob Graham, USA; Seymour Martin Lipset, USA; Matthew McHugh, USA
 2003: Enrique Bolaños, Nicaragua; Donald M. Payne, USA
 2002: Chen-Wu Sue-jen, Taiwan; Jan Nowak, Poland; Paula J. Dobriansky, USA
 2001: John Brademas, USA; Fred Iklé, USA; Richard Lugar, USA; Stephen Solarz, USA
 2000: John B. Hurford, USA
 1999: Lech Walesa, Poland; Lane Kirkland, USA; Alexandr Vondra, Czech Republic; Martin Butora, Slovakia

References

Lists of award winners
Awards established in 1999
American awards
1999 establishments in the United States